Hitachi G1000 may refer to:

 the Hitachi SH-G1000 smartphone
 the Hitachi VSP-G1000 enterprise disk array

See also:
 G1000 (disambiguation)